Rio Vista (Spanish: Río Vista, meaning "River View") is a city located in the eastern end of Solano County, California, in the Sacramento River Delta region of Northern California. The population was 7,360 at the 2010 census.

Geography

Climate
According to the Köppen Climate Classification system, Rio Vista has a warm-summer Mediterranean climate, abbreviated "Csa" on climate maps.

History
The present location of Rio Vista is several miles south of the original settlement.  Colonel Nathan H. Davis founded "Brazos del Rio" near the entrance of Cache Slough at the Sacramento River, on the Rancho Los Ulpinos Mexican land grant, in 1858.  The settlement was renamed "Rio Vista" before a flood in 1862 that resulted in the town moving to its present location on higher ground.  The city's name combines the Spanish words for "river" and "view."  Post authorities established office in 1858.  The community was officially incorporated as Rio Vista on December 30, 1893. The newspaper of record there is the River News-Herald and Isleton Journal, established in 1890. 

From 1911 through 1992 Rio Vista was home to the United States Army Reserve Center, Rio Vista. The facility was initially established as a base for river control activities by the U.S. Army Corps of Engineers. During the 1950s it was used by the U.S. Army Transportation Corps to store and maintain harbor craft, and during the 1960s and 1970s it was used to prepare amphibious vehicles for transportation to Vietnam and to train troops in their use. In 1980 it was transferred to the U.S. Army Reserve and in 1992 it was closed due to a BRAC decision. The town also hosts a United States Coast Guard station, established in 1963.

Rio Vista was visited by a lost humpback whale in 1985, despite being 60 miles (100 kilometers) upriver from the Pacific Ocean. The young whale, nicknamed "Humphrey", attracted throngs of curiosity seekers before he was eventually guided back to sea by rescuers. The Army Reserve Unit (481st Transportation Company (Heavy Boat)) was activated to use their vessels (Landing Craft Utility (LCU)) to assist in the guiding of Humphrey back to the sea. Again in May 2007, humpbacks were sighted in Rio Vista. "Delta" and "Dawn," mother and calf, stopped at least twice in the river near the town.

Demographics

2010
At the 2010 census Rio Vista had a population of 7,360. The racial makeup of Rio Vista was 6,003 (81.6%) White, 372 (5.1%) African American, 53 (0.7%) Native American, 359 (4.9%) Asian, 15 (0.2%) Pacific Islander, 288 (3.9%) from other races, and 270 (3.7%) from two or more races. Hispanic or Latino of any race were 914 people (12.4%).

The census reported that 100% of the population lived in households.

There were 3,454 households, 626 (18.1%) had children under the age of 18 living in them, 1,846 (53.4%) were opposite-sex married couples living together, 255 (7.4%) had a female householder with no husband present, 139 (4.0%) had a male householder with no wife present.  There were 146 (4.2%) unmarried opposite-sex partnerships, and 24 (0.7%) same-sex married couples or partnerships. 1,045 households (30.3%) were one person and 605 (17.5%) had someone living alone who was 65 or older. The average household size was 2.13.  There were 2,240 families (64.9% of households); the average family size was 2.60.

The age distribution was 1,145 people (15.6%) under the age of 18, 349 people (4.7%) aged 18 to 24, 1,089 people (14.8%) aged 25 to 44, 2,400 people (32.6%) aged 45 to 64, and 2,377 people (32.3%) who were 65 or older.  The median age was 57.2 years. For every 100 females, there were 92.6 males.  For every 100 females age 18 and over, there were 91.3 males.

The homeowner vacancy rate was 2.7%; the rental vacancy rate was 13.7%. 75.1% of the population lived in owner-occupied housing units and 24.9% lived in rental housing units.

2007
As of 2007, there were 7,876 people in 1,881 households, including 1,286 families, in the city. The racial makeup of the city was 88.34% White, 1.18% African American, 0.92% Native American, 1.60% Asian, 0.02% Pacific Islander, 4.09% from other races, and 3.85% from two or more races. Hispanic or Latino of any race were 11.42% of the population.

There were 1,881 households, 29.0% had children under the age of 18 living with them, 55.9% were married couples living together, 8.7% had a female householder with no husband present, and 31.6% were non-families. 26.4% of households were one person and 13.9% were one person aged 65 or older. The average household size was 2.43 and the average family size was 2.92.

The age distribution was 25.0% under the age of 18, 6.1% from 18 to 24, 25.6% from 25 to 44, 23.6% from 45 to 64, and 19.7% 65 or older. The median age was 41 years. For every 100 females, there were 95.4 males. For every 100 females age 18 and over, there were 92.4 males.

The median income for a household in the city was $44,534, and the median family income  was $52,007. Males had a median income of $43,458 versus $28,665 for females. The per capita income for the city was $24,627. About 6.6% of families and 10.2% of the population were below the poverty line, including 17.7% of those under age 18 and 2.5% of those age 65 or over.

The Trilogy at Rio Vista development, aimed at active adults, is a mile northwest of the original city on the Rio Vista Highway (SR 12). It is built around the 18-hole Rio Vista Golf Club. There will be between 2,800 and 3,000 homes when Trilogy is complete.

Industry
Natural gas was discovered in the Rio Vista area in 1936 and the Rio Vista Field,  ( RVGU Rio Vista Gas Unit ) at one time there was a gas well behind RV City Hall in the middle of boat launch parking lot.  Amerada Hess Corporation was the first major operations. When Amerada sold out to Sheridan Energy another buy out would soon take shape by Calpine Natural Gas. Calpine fell into the energy collapse when Enron went under then Calpine sold off a majority of its natural gas holdings to Rosetta Resources. Next buyer was Vintage Petroleum who sold out to and currently running operations California Resources Corporation as of 2022. Same address since 1936. Rio Vista Gas Unit was the largest natural gas field in California, became a major source of employment for the remainder of the 20th century. Other industries include agriculture, manufacturing and tourism. There are over 750 wind turbines belonging to the three renewable energy projects (Shiloh Wind Power Plant, NextEra Energy Resources' High Winds Energy Center and one owned by the Sacramento Municipal Utility District) on the Montezuma Hills, close to the city. There are plans to add an additional 200 wind turbines.

Rio Vista is home to the largest American producer of Belgian Endive in the United States. Craig Breedlove, five-time world land speed record holder, lives and has an engineering facility in the city.

The city is served by Rio Vista Municipal Airport and is situated along the Rio Vista Highway (SR 12) between Fairfield and Lodi. The highway crosses the Sacramento River via the Helen Madere Memorial Bridge, colloquially known as the Rio Vista Bridge.

Local attractions
 Dutra Museum of Dredging
 Locke, California – the oldest surviving California town founded by Chinese immigrants.
 Rio Vista Golf Club.
 Rio Vista Museum
 Western Railway Museum – west of Rio Vista on CA-12 in Suisun City.
 Rio Vista is home to the annual Bass Festival in October.
 Foster's Bighorn — a bar and restaurant at 143 Main Street that dates back to the early 1930s and features more than 300 taxidermy trophies from Africa, Canada, and other parts of the world, all of which were hunted an collected by the establishment's founder, Bill Foster.

In popular culture
  Rio Vista was mentioned at the end of a 2012 AT&T television commercial in which a man jogs from San Francisco until he gets lost, then the GPS on his phone tells him that he is in Rio Vista.

Notable residents
Craig Breedlove, auto speed record holder
Bill Wight, Major League Baseball pitcher and scout

Gallery

See also

 List of cities and towns in California
 List of cities and towns in the San Francisco Bay Area

References
Notes

External links
 
 Rio Vista Chamber of Commerce

Incorporated cities and towns in California
Cities in Solano County, California
Cities in the San Francisco Bay Area
Sacramento–San Joaquin River Delta
Populated places on the Sacramento River